Agoliinus is a genus of beetles belonging to the family Scarabaeidae.

The species of this genus are found in Europe, Asia, North America, and Central America.

Species
These 43 species belong to the genus Agoliinus. Many of these species were transferred from the genus Aphodius.

 Agoliinus albertanus (Brown, 1928)
 Agoliinus aleutus (Eschscholtz, 1822)
 Agoliinus amurensis (Iablokov-khnzorian, 1972)
 Agoliinus anthracus Gordon & Skelley, 2007
 Agoliinus aquilonarius (Brown, 1928)
 Agoliinus ashworthi (Gordon, 2006)
 Agoliinus bidentatus (Schmidt, 1906)
 Agoliinus canadensis (Garnett, 1920)
 Agoliinus congregatus (Mannerheim, 1853)
 Agoliinus corruptor (Brown, 1929)
 Agoliinus cruentatus (LeConte, 1878)
 Agoliinus durrelli Rakovič & Mencl, 2011
 Agoliinus explanatus (LeConte, 1878)
 Agoliinus guttatus (Eschscholtz, 1823)
 Agoliinus hatchi Gordon & Skelley, 2007
 Agoliinus idahoensis Gordon & Skelley, 2007
 Agoliinus incommunis (Fall, 1932)
 Agoliinus ingenursus Gordon & Skelley, 2007
 Agoliinus isajevi (Kabakov, 1996)
 Agoliinus kiuchii (Masumoto, 1984)
 Agoliinus lapponum (Gyllenhal, 1808)
 Agoliinus leopardus (Horn, 1870)
 Agoliinus malkini (Hatch, 1971)
 Agoliinus manitobensis (Brown, 1928)
 Agoliinus morii (Nakane, 1983)
 Agoliinus nemoralis (Erichson, 1848)
 Agoliinus parastorkani (Červenka, 1995)
 Agoliinus piceatus (Robinson, 1946)
 Agoliinus piceus (Gyllenhal, 1808)
 Agoliinus pittinoi (Carpaneto, 1986)
 Agoliinus plutonicus (Fall, 1907)
 Agoliinus poudreus Gordon & Skelley, 2007
 Agoliinus praealtus Gordon & Skelley, 2007
 Agoliinus pseudostorkani (Stebnicka, 1982)
 Agoliinus ragusae (Reitter, 1892)
 Agoliinus satunini (Olsoufieff, 1918)
 Agoliinus satyrus (Reitter, 1892)
 Agoliinus setchan (Masumoto, 1984)
 Agoliinus shibatai (Nakane, 1983)
 Agoliinus sigmoideus (Van Dyke, 1918)
 Agoliinus storkani (Balthasar, 1932)
 Agoliinus tanakai (Masumoto, 1981)
 Agoliinus wickhami (Brown, 1928)

References

Scarabaeidae
Scarabaeidae genera